Mevlan Adili (born 30 March 1994) is a Macedonian professional footballer of Albanian descent who plays as a centre back with albanian team Bylis Ballsh.

Club career
Adili started his career at Albarsa and then continued to play in Macedonia for clubs like Shkëndija and Shkupi. In Romania he played in Liga II for UTA Arad.

International career
He is also a member of the Macedonia U-21 national football team.

Honours

Club
Shkendija
 Macedonian First League: 2017–18
 Macedonian Football Cup: 2017–18

References

External links

1994 births
Living people
Footballers from Skopje
Albanian footballers from North Macedonia
Association football central defenders
Macedonian footballers
North Macedonia under-21 international footballers
FK Shkupi players
KF Shkëndija players
FC UTA Arad players
FK Žalgiris players
KF Vllaznia Shkodër players
FC SKA-Khabarovsk players
Macedonian First Football League players
Liga II players
A Lyga players
Kategoria Superiore players
Russian First League players
Macedonian expatriate footballers
Expatriate footballers in Romania
Expatriate footballers in Lithuania
Expatriate footballers in Albania
Expatriate footballers in Russia
Macedonian expatriate sportspeople in Romania
Macedonian expatriate sportspeople in Lithuania
Macedonian expatriate sportspeople in Albania
Macedonian expatriate sportspeople in Russia